Bonerif is a Papuan language of Indonesia. It is closely related to Berik. The ISO 639 standard confuses it with Beneraf, another language in the same family.

References

Languages of western New Guinea
Orya–Tor languages